Sarah Lockett (born in Surrey) is a TV news anchor and reporter.

Professional
Lockett started out recording 0898 information telephone lines, before working for Capital Radio, London. Lockett then became a TV news anchor and reporter, who has worked for Sky News, Channel Four News,  BBC News 24, ITN and Forces TV. She has also written for newspapers including The Scotsman (for 18 months). Lockett has written articles for various magazines alongside her broadcast news career and she also has a food/cooking blog at Money Magpie

Stalker
In January 2000 a 30-year-old man was jailed for 30 months for stalking Lockett. He wrote some 80 letters, stalked the Meridian studios, and tried to find out her home address. He told Lockett: "Every celebrity needs a stalker." The court case preceded cases involving Emily Maitlis and Julia Somerville.

Career history
 1987 - 0898 telephone services + local radio.
 1988 - Capital Radio, London
 1991/2001 - BBC Newsroom Southeast
 1994-96 - ITN/Channel4: inc 'House to House', 'The Big Breakfast', and 'Channel4 News'. 'ITN Morning News' (as Reporter and Producer). Channel 5 News
 1995-96 - Reuters Business TV
 1998-2000 - Meridian TV: anchor of the local evening news programme, "Meridian Tonight"
 2000-2002 - Freelance, incl Sky News, Channel 4 News, BBC News24
 2004 – Local Government Channel (presenter), corporate TV reporter/presenter, Conference facilitator
 2010-2011 BBC London News (presenter cover), Websedge TV (media trainer)
 2010 to date - ITN Productions (presenter/reporter), ITN Industry News (presenter/reporter), The Business Channel (presenter), Topline Communications (Presenter, media trainer)
 2014 - Forces TV News (reporter), Media Training Associates (trainer), ITN Industry News, The Business Channel

Books
"The Dish " by Penny Isaacs and Sarah Lockett (published by Troubador, February 2009, £9.95)

"Feed Your Family for Less"  (published by Moneymagpie.com, 2010, £4.99)

Newspapers & Magazines
Specialises in writing health, food & diet features and humour, and is a member of the Guild of Food Writers.

 London Evening Standard
 The Scotsman: wrote a daily cookery column for 18 months (2000–2001)
 The Sunday Post
 Healthy magazine
 Shape magazine

See also
BBC News

References

External links
MoneyMagpie.com, Food & Family - Lockett's personal blog on healthy eating

1968 births
Living people
BBC newsreaders and journalists
English reporters and correspondents
English food writers
British television newsreaders and news presenters
English journalists
People from Surrey